At least two ships of the French Navy have been named Sakalave:

 , an  launched in 1917 and struck in 1936.
 , a  launched as USS Wingfield and transferred to France in 1950. She was broken up in 1960.

French Navy ship names